"Better than You" is a song by American heavy metal band Metallica. It is the fifth track on their seventh album, Reload. The song was originally titled "Better". It won the 1999 Grammy Award for Best Metal Performance, the band's fourth award in that category. The song is about someone who is obsessed of the struggle to be better than someone else. The band performed a jam of the song for the first time in London in 1995. The single cover features the same picture as the cover of Metallica's Cunning Stunts as well as on the final page of Reload. The 2011 book Metallica: The Music and the Mayhem describes the song as "[qualifying] on all grounds, with lyrics full of festering resentment, and Hammett giving a lengthy solo."

Track listing
1998 CD promo (USA: Elektra PRCD 1149-2)
"Better than You" – 5:21

1998 CD promo (USA: Elektra PRCD 1165-2)
"Better than You (Edit)" – 4:44

Personnel
 James Hetfield – lead vocals, rhythm guitar, producer
 Kirk Hammett – lead guitar
 Jason Newsted – bass, backing vocals
 Lars Ulrich – drums, producer
 Bob Rock – producer

References

1997 songs
1998 singles
Grammy Award for Best Metal Performance
Metallica songs
Songs written by James Hetfield
Songs written by Lars Ulrich
Elektra Records singles
Song recordings produced by Bob Rock
American hard rock songs